A maternity hospital is a hospital for the care of newborns and of mothers giving birth.

Maternity Hospital as a name may mean:

 Ripley Memorial Hospital (Minneapolis, Minnesota), a former hospital, named "Maternity Hospital" from 1886 founding to sometime in the 20th century
 Brooklyn Hebrew Maternity Hospital, in New York, formerly known as Maternity Hospital of Brownsville and East New York